Terra Rubra is a historic home and plantation located near Keysville, Carroll County, Maryland, United States.  It was the birth site of Francis Scott Key in 1779.  The present Federal-style house was built in the 1850s after the Key residence had become badly deteriorated. The original house was built in the 1770s by Francis Key for his son, John Ross Key, father of Francis Scott Key.

It was listed on the National Register of Historic Places in 1978.

References

External links
, including photo in 2002, at Maryland Historical Trust

Houses completed in the 18th century
Houses in Carroll County, Maryland
Federal architecture in Maryland
Houses on the National Register of Historic Places in Maryland
Journey Through Hallowed Ground National Heritage Area
Key family of Maryland
National Register of Historic Places in Carroll County, Maryland